Giorgio Altare (born 9 August 1998) is an Italian professional footballer who plays as a defender for  club Cagliari.

Club career

Milan
He is a product of Milan youth teams. He spent the second half of the 2015–16 season on loan at Serie D club Alzano Seriate. Late in the 2016–17 Serie A season he was called up to the senior squad for one game, but remained on the bench.

Genoa
In the summer of 2017 he moved to Genoa. He spent the 2017–18 season with their Under-19 squad, he didn't receive any call-ups to the senior squad during that season.

Loan to Feralpisalò
On 20 July 2018 he joined Serie C club Feralpisalò on a season-long loan. In September, he suffered an ACL rupture and the recovery took most of the rest of the 2018–19 season.

He made his professional Serie C debut for Feralpisalò on 5 May 2019 in a game against Pordenone. He replaced Paolo Marchi in the 72nd minute. He made his first starting line-up appearance on 29 May 2019 against Triestina. He finished the season with 5 appearances (1 as a starter).

On 11 July 2019 the loan was extended for the 2019–20 season. He made one league appearance (as a starter) and one Coppa Italia appearance for Feralpisalò in the 2019–20 season.

Loan to Olbia
On 16 January 2020 he joined Olbia in Serie C on loan. The loan was renewed for the 2020–21 season on 26 August 2020.

Cagliari
On 18 July 2021 he signed a four-year contract with Cagliari. On 1 October 2021 he made his Serie A debut for Cagliari in a 1–1 home draw against Venezia.

References

External links
 

1998 births
Footballers from Bergamo
Living people
Italian footballers
Association football defenders
A.C. Milan players
Virtus Bergamo Alzano Seriate 1909 players
FeralpiSalò players
Olbia Calcio 1905 players
Cagliari Calcio players
Serie A players
Serie B players
Serie C players
Serie D players